Scandinavian Airlines System Flight 871 was a scheduled flight from Copenhagen in Denmark to the Egyptian capital of Cairo, with several intermediate stops, operated by Scandinavian Airlines System. On 19 January 1960, the Sud Aviation Caravelle flying the service crashed while operating a leg between Yeşilköy Airport and Esenboğa International Airport in Turkey. The flight was on approach but crashed six nautical miles from the airport, killing all 42 occupants on board. This was the first fatal crash of a Caravelle.

Accident
Flight 871 took off from Copenhagen Airport at 09:44 UTC. The aircraft had already stopped at Düsseldorf in Germany and Vienna in Austria before arriving at Istanbul at 17:20 UTC, where a fresh crew boarded the aircraft to operate the remaining portion of the flight. It departed Istanbul's Yeşilköy Airport at 18:00 UTC on a flight to Ankara's Esenboğa International Airport in Turkey. There were 35 passengers and 7 crew on board the aircraft. The flight was uneventful until the crew started the approach to the airport. At 18:41 UTC the crew reported to air traffic control that the aircraft was in a descent from FL135 (approximately 13,500 feet/4,115 m) to FL120 (approximately 12,000 feet/3,658 m). At 18:45 UTC the crew reported inbound at an altitude of 6500 feet (1,981 m) still in a descent. At 18:47 UTC the aircraft struck the ground at an elevation of 3500 feet (1,067 m), between the Ankara range and the airport. The accident killed all 42 passengers and crew on board.

Cause
"The accident occurred because of an unintentional descent below the authorized minimum flight altitude during final approach to Esenboga Airport. The reason for this descent could not be ascertained due to lack of conclusive evidence."

References

External Links
aviation-safety.net accident synopsis
planecrashinfo.com accident synopsis

1960 in Turkey
Accidents and incidents involving the Sud Aviation Caravelle
Aviation accidents and incidents in 1960
Aviation accidents and incidents in Turkey
871
January 1960 events in Europe
1960 disasters in Turkey